Justice Read may refer to:

George Read (American politician, born 1733) (1733–1798), chief justice of Delaware
John M. Read (1797–1874), chief justice of the Pennsylvania Supreme Court
Susan Phillips Read (born 1947), judge of the New York Court of Appeals

See also
Edwin Godwin Reade, associate justice of the North Carolina Supreme Court
Justice Reed (disambiguation)
Justice Reid (disambiguation)